Rishton Ke Bhanwar Mein Uljhi Niyati is an Indian television series that premiered on Sahara One on 6 January 2007. The series is produced by Dheeraj Kumar of Creative Eye Limited. The show ended on 27 March 2015.

Plot
The story begins when Niyati and Amber fall in love and get married. They face many stormy situations but their love for each other carries them through. Niyati's father became paralyzed due to an accident, niyati and amaber helps it's financially, but vaishali and his husband did't like this. Niyati's father became a servant at a massage parlour where he didn't know that he is working in sex parlour, once his daughter come to parlour for giving lunch to his father, polices raid in the parlour, where niyati's father is working, police arrested he and his daughter, niyati tries to prove his father's innocence, but amabr didn't believe niyati, time passes niyati proved his fathers innocence, where his father is leaves the house, after some time shastri's shifted to the new house, where he faced many problems, after years niyati pregnant with amber'child but vaishali,s consirpiracy against niyati is lead to his child's accidentally death coming from mahableshwar. While traveling to banglore, amber meets with in an accident, but he revived and saved by Mr. Rao, Amber's family is shocked by this but niyati didn't believe that ambar is no more.

Then, Amber loses his memory and start living with Natasha and her family taking himself for being Siddhart Rao (Sid).
On the other hand, Niyati is left alone thinking Amber died of the accident. Her mother-in-law not accepting to see her as a widow gives her oath to marry Akash a guy sent by Vaishali to destroy the family. Niyati endures his atrocities and everyone thinks she is mad until she saws Sid and tries to prove that he is Amber but Sid refuse to accept the fact, trusting his now wife Natasha.

Niyati finds that she is pregnant with Amber's child and in excitement she goes to Bangalore where Amber now lives with Natasha's parents. There he refuses knowing Niyati and they insults her. Disappointed Niyati goes away to face an accident where her father saves her. 
After this incident Niyati decides to come and live with his father at Bangalore determined as ever to get his Amber back.

Time passes and Niyati has a little daughter Anshika (fruity) and Sid and Natasha a son named Krish (Duggu). Niyati now teaches at the school where Fruity and Duggu become best friends. When Natasha finds about Fruity's mom she tries to keep Sid away from the school. But Sid eventually finds that Fruity is Niyati's daughter!

after diwali, Natasha called niyati that he wanted to meet her, in his pathway amber sees him, and located him, during conversation with Natasa, he pushed himself, sudden amber sees him, and he has gained his all lost memory, Natasha's parents are shocked.

Niyati falls in coma, Amber discharged Niyati take him to his house, which is not liked by his mother in law and Natasha, after several days Niyati gains his consciousness. Amber cares for niyati which is not like by his mother-in-law and Natasha, Natasha called Niyati that he take cares of his daughter along with duggu, if he leave amber and go to his home. During the conversation of devank, Natasha listened to all the conversation of his and his mindset for killing amber and niyati. Natasha was hit by a gunshot while saving Niyati, back to the Rao house, where he take care of both children. Natasha's mom did not like Niyati, Devang impressed his sister And marry him for devastating niyati, after few days of marriage devang turn evil for Niyati's sister. While trying to save his sister niyati goes on devang's home and devang hit a glass to Niyati's stomach. After conversation with Amber, Niyati wants a promise that he will take care of both children. Then Niyati died.

After 15 years, amber shifted to Lucknow from banglore and Frooti Changed his name to niyati and become a dsp officer. Ishwar Sharma a youth leader, Who wants to become the biggest politician of Lucknow, but he comes face to face again and again with (niyati), Radha (Sister of Ishwar) and Duggu (Brother of Niyati) become Friends. Ishwar and his grandmother want Niyati to become their daughter-in-law under a plan and for this Ishwar has now started trapping Niyati in the trap of his false love. and niyati started trapping in ishwar's fake love. Ishwar's mother, aunt and uncle go to Niyati's house to thank her. And sudden niyati and ishwar who gone a fake date has come, and all have shock to see him. After going home ishwar's mother ask ishwar that does he loves niyati.

Cast 
 Jayshree Soni as Niyati Sharma / Niyati Amber Shastri
 Alan Kapoor / Sachin Shroff as Amber Shastri / Siddharth Rao | Siddharth Shastri Post Leap 
 Parakh Madan as Natasha Amber Shastri / Natasha Siddharth Rao
 Aastha Chaudhary as Niyati and Amber's Daughter Frooti(Child) 
 DSP Niyati Shastri / DSP Niyati Ishwar Sha(Teen)hter
 Smriti Mohan as Vaishali Shastri
 Simple Kaul as Geet 
 Tabrez Khan as Ishwar Sharma
 Sachin Sharma as Krishna Sharma (Ishwar's Stepbrother)
 Khyaati Khandke Keswani as Parvati Sharma (Ishwar's Mother)
 Kiran Bhargava as Mrs. Sharma (Ishwar's Grandmother)
 Roma Bali as Durga (Ishwar's Aunt)
 Nupur Alankar
 Seerat Ain Alam as Pinky
 Naveen Saini as Durga's Husband
 Sushil Parashar as Mr. Shastri
 Aruna Singhal  as Mrs. Shastri
 Virendra Singh
 Aryamann Sehgal as Devang
 Vaibhav Mathur

References

Sahara One original programming
Indian drama television series
2011 Indian television series debuts
2014 Indian television series endings